Kar is a suffix used after the names of villages along the western coast of India, forming the most common surnames used by the Marathi and Konkani people in Maharashtra, Goa and some parts of Karnataka.

Kar is the surname of mostly the Brahmins of Kashmir, Maharashtra, Bengal and Odisha. Kar Brahmins hail from Karhama village in Kashmir, India. In Bengal, the Kar surname is also used by people of the Kayastha clan.

Etymology
The suffix Kar comes from the Sanskrit , which means "making, doing, lord of", later modified to mean "hailing from" or "belonging to" in Prakrit-based languages.

Usage
Such surnames are commonly used by communities of Konkani and Marathi ethnicities all over India. Most of them identify themselves with a place their ancestors hailed from, or sometimes with new places to which they have migrated. For example, if a person hails from the village of Borim in Goa, his surname would be ; this custom is also followed by Konkani migrants to Karnataka. If a person hails from the town of Sirsi, the surname used would be Sirsekār. The surname Kar is also used in countries like :Bangladesh, :Iran, :Turkey, :Myanmar, :Egypt, and others.

References

Indian surnames